Periyaloor  is a village in the Aranthangirevenue block of Pudukkottai district, Tamil Nadu, India.

Demographics 

As per the 2001 census, Periyaloor had a total population of 1937 with 1011 males and 926 females. Out of the total population 1283 people were literate.

References

Villages in Pudukkottai district